Kanaji Shankarji Thakor  was an Indian politician who served as the mayor of the city of Ahmedabad, in the state of Gujarat, India from 23 April 2008 to 30 October 2010. He is affiliated with Bharatiya Janata Party.

He is appointed as Member of Election Parliamentary Board of Gujarat State By Bharatiya Janata Party

References 

Ahmedabad civic officials
Gujarati people
Mayors of Ahmedabad
Living people
Bharatiya Janata Party politicians from Gujarat
Year of birth missing (living people)